"Io non abito al mare" is a song performed by Italian singer Francesca Michielin. The song was released as a digital download on 17 November 2017 by Sony Music Entertainment. The song has peaked at number 15 on the Italian Singles Chart.

Background
In an interview with Sky Magazine Italy, she explained that the song "is about the difficulty of communicating or, more specifically, the difference between hearing and listening, and the obstacles between the words that we want to say".

Critical reception
William Lee Adams from Wiwibloggs said, "The X Factor Italia winner proves once again that she’s a master of understatement: She never lets the music overtake her. She wraps her arms around it and exudes passion that draws you in. Power, she demonstrates, has many shades — including the supple and nuanced. As we’ve come to expect from the Italian songstress, the lyrics are gorgeous."

Music video
An official music video to accompany the release of "Io non abito al mare" was first released onto YouTube on 20 November 2017 at a total length of three minutes and fourteen seconds. It was directed by Giacomo Triglia and filmed at Cretto di Burri in Sicily.

Track listing

Charts

Certifications

Release history

References

2017 songs
2017 singles
Francesca Michielin songs
Songs written by Calcutta (singer)